The C&C 131 is an American sailboat, that was designed by Tim Jackett and entered production in 2008.

Production
The boat was built by C&C Yachts in the United States, but it is now out of production.

Design
The C&C 131 is a small recreational keelboat, built predominantly of fiberglass. It has a fractional sloop rig, an internally-mounted spade-type rudder and a fixed fin keel. It displaces  and carries  of lead ballast.

The boat is fitted with an inboard engine.

See also
List of sailing boat types

Similar sailboats
CS 44
Hunter Passage 42
Marlow-Hunter 42SS

References

Keelboats
2000s sailboat type designs
Sailing yachts
Sailboat type designs by Tim Jackett
Sailboat types built by C&C Yachts